Takeru: Letter of the Law is a video game based on the manga series by Buichi Terasawa. It was originally released by Matsushita Electric Industrial for the 3DO Interactive Multiplayer only in Japan as Terasawa Buichi no Takeru (寺沢武一の武), before being converted to the Microsoft Windows and Mac OS computer systems and published internationally Takeru: Letter of the Law and Buichi Terasawa's Takeru in 1996. The manga was published in English in 1992-1993 as Takeru - The Bad Boy of Yamato.

Plot
The game's and the manga's story follows the bounty hunter shinobi (ninja) Takeru Ichimonji and his female sidekick Bumbuku in the land of Yamato as they battle the evil sorceress Kaganju to rescue the Wind Princess Hien and prevent the resurrection of Queen Himiko.

Reception
The game received mixed reviews, including the scores of 22/40 from Japanese magazine  Weekly Famicom Tsūshin (Famitsu),
37/100 from German magazine PC Player, and 6.8/10 from UK magazine PC Zone.

References

External links
 Official website
 Buichi Terasawa's Takeru: Letter of the Law at MobyGames

1992 manga
1994 video games
3DO Interactive Multiplayer games
Adventure games
Japanese mythology in anime and manga
Classic Mac OS games
Ninja in anime and manga
Video games about ninja
Science fantasy video games
Sunsoft games
Video games based on anime and manga
Video games based on Japanese mythology
Video games developed in Japan
Video games featuring female protagonists
Windows games